Scorpion Island may refer to:

 Scorpion Island, an island belonging to the nation of St. Lucia.
 Scorpion Island, an alternative name for Gasparillo Island, an islet in the Republic of Trinidad and Tobago.
 Escape from Scorpion Island, a children's game show produced by the BBC in the United Kingdom.